The Mars orbiter 2001 Mars Odyssey found much evidence for water on Mars in the form of pictures, and with a spectrometer it proved that much of the ground is loaded with ice.

Evidence
In July 2003, at a conference in California, it was announced that the Gamma Ray Spectrometer (GRS) on board the Mars Odyssey had discovered huge amounts of water over vast areas of Mars. Mars has enough ice just beneath the surface to fill Lake Michigan twice.  In both hemispheres, from 55 degrees latitude to the poles, Mars has a high density of ice just under the surface; one kilogram of soil contains about 500 g of water ice. But, close to the equator, there is only 2 to 10% of water in the soil.  Scientists believe that much of this water is locked up in the chemical structure of minerals, such as clay and sulfates. Previous studies with infrared spectroscopes have provided evidence of small amounts of chemically or physically bound water.

The Viking landers detected low levels of chemically bound water in the Martian soil.  It is believed that although the upper surface only contains a percent or so of water, ice may lie just a few feet deeper. Some areas, Arabia Terra, Amazonis quadrangle, and Elysium quadrangle contain large amounts of water.  Analysis of the data suggest that the southern hemisphere may have a layered structure. Both of the poles showed buried ice, but the north pole had none close to it because it was covered over by seasonal carbon dioxide (dry ice). When the measurements were gathered, it was winter at the north pole so carbon dioxide had frozen on top of the water ice.  There may be much more water further below the surface; the instruments aboard the Mars Odyssey are only able to study the top meter or so of soil. If all holes in the soil were filled by water, this would correspond to a global layer of water 0.5 to 1.5 km deep.

The Phoenix lander confirmed the initial findings of the Mars Odyssey.  It found ice a few inches below the surface and the ice is at least 8 inches deep. When the ice is exposed to the Martian atmosphere it slowly sublimates. In fact, some of the ice was exposed by the landing rockets of the craft.

Thousands of images returned from Odyssey support the idea that Mars once had great amounts of water flowing across its surface. Some pictures show patterns of branching valleys. Others show layers that may have formed under lakes. Deltas have been identified.
For many years researchers believed that glaciers existed under a layer of insulating rocks.Lineated valley fill  is one example of these rock-covered glaciers. They are found on the floors of some channels. Their surfaces have ridged and grooved materials that deflect around obstacles. Some glaciers on the Earth show such features. Lineated floor deposits may be related to Lobate debris aprons, which have been proven to contain large amounts of ice by orbiting radar.

The pictures below, taken with the THEMIS instrument on board the Mars Odyssey, show examples of features that are associated with water present in the present or past.

Dao Vallis begins near a large volcano, called Hadriaca Patera, so it is thought to have received water when hot magma melted huge amounts of ice in the frozen ground. The partially circular depressions on the left side of the channel in the image above suggests that groundwater sapping also contributed water.
In some areas large river valleys begin with a landscape feature called "Chaos" or Chaotic Terrain."  It is thought that the ground collapsed, as huge amounts of water were suddenly released. Examples of Chaotic terrain, as imaged by THEMIS, are shown below.

See also
Evidence of water on Mars from Mars Odyssey
Water on Mars

References

2001 Mars Odyssey
Exploration of Mars
Water on Mars